Prince Henryk Ludwik Lubomirski (1777–1850) was a Polish noble (szlachcic), magnate, political activist and patron of the arts.

Life
He was the son of Józef Aleksander Lubomirski, he married Teresa Czartoryska (1785–1868), daughter of Prince Józef Klemens Czartoryski (1740–1810).

He served as Prefect of the Kraków Department of the Duchy of Warsaw in 1810. In 1813, he established the Przesąd Zwyciężony masonic lodge.
In 1823, he founded the Lubomirski Princes Museum in Lviv (it was officially re-established in 1995 and is now part of Ossolineum in Wrocław).

He was the great-grandfather of Cardinal Adam Stefan Sapieha.

See also
Lubomirski family
Szlachta

Ancestry

References  

1777 births
1850 deaths
Jozef Aleksander Lubomirski 1751
Recipients of the Order of the White Eagle (Poland)
Polish patrons of the arts